Darby Christopher McDevitt is an Irish-American game developer and writer, best known for his work on the Assassin's Creed series.

With a diverse professional profile spanning more than a decade, he has worked as a writer, film maker, musician, and game designer. As an employee of Ubisoft, McDevitt has been the script writer for both the story and dialogue in Assassin's Creed: Bloodlines, Assassin's Creed II: Discovery, Assassin's Creed: Embers and Assassin's Creed Unity, as well as was the lead writer for Assassin's Creed: Revelations and Assassin's Creed IV: Black Flag. In 2014, Darby was nominated for a Writers Guild of America Award for his work on Black Flag. Darby is also recognized as a spokesperson for Ubisoft in regards to the Assassin's Creed franchise.

In March 2021, Darby left Ubisoft, but returned in November.

Games

Upcoming
 Assassin's Creed: Codename Hexe

Narrative Director
 Assassin's Creed Valhalla

Writer
 Assassin's Creed Valhalla
 Assassin's Creed Unity (co-writer)
 Assassin's Creed IV: Black Flag
 Assassin's Creed: Revelations
 Assassin's Creed II: Discovery
 Assassin's Creed: Bloodlines
 The Sims 2 DS
 The Chronicles of Narnia: The Lion, the Witch and the Wardrobe
 The Urbz: Sims in the City
 Lord of the Rings: The Third Age
 The Sims Bustin' Out

Writer and Designer
 Where the Wild Things Are
 Lord of the Rings: The Two Towers GBA

Producer and Writer
 ClueFinders: The Incredible Toy Store Adventure!

Other notable works 

Music Videos:  
"Threes" by Autographic
"Change" by Sneaky Thieves
"When I Die" by Sneaky Thieves
"Quarry" by Sneaky Thieves
"Lesser" by Sneaky Thieves
"Brotherly" album medley by Sneaky Thieves

Narrative and Documentary Films:
 "Recital" (Short)
 "Proscenium" (Short)
 "Day Fable" (Short)
 "The Making of Cowards Bend The Knee" (Documentary Featurette )

Music:

Sneaky Thieves
 "Brotherly" 2010 Other Electricites
 "Accidents" 2007 Other Electricites

Autographic
 "Technoir Classics" 2012
 "The Attic" 2009

Awards and nominations

References

External links
 
Interview with Darby McDevitt at Scripts & Scribes

Video game designers
Video game writers
Living people
Alumni of the National University of Ireland
Ubisoft people
1975 births